Lufu may refer to:

 Lufu (food), a type of fermented bean curd
 Lufu language of Nigeria
 Lufu River or Luvo River, a river of Angola and the Democratic Republic of the Congo
 Loserfruit, Australian YouTuber